Camponotus triodiae is a species of ant found in Australia, originally discovered in northern South Australia.  The ants' nests have a distinctive entrance created from a combination of a long tube of spinifex grass and red outback soil.

References

triodiae
Hymenoptera of Australia
Insects described in 2009